On 8 March 2018, International Women's Day, Spanish women went on strike for the day to denounce sexual discrimination, domestic violence and the wage gap.

Description 

Participants, led by women's organizations and the trade unions, did not go to their paid jobs, especially in education, and did not do any housework or child-rearing for the whole day; some groups additionally called for a consumption strike. The unions estimate that 5 million women participated in the strike, with massive demonstrations taking place in the most populated cities of the country.

The action was part of the annual International Women's Strike.

References

Protests in Spain
2018 in Spain
General strikes in Spain
Women's rights in Spain
Feminist protests
2018 in women's history
Protests in the European Union
March 2018 events in Spain